State Road 165 is a  route in Gibson and Posey counties in the U.S. State of Indiana.

Route description
State Road 165 starts at State Road 66 near Wadesville then goes north through Poseyville where it intersects Interstate 64 at Exit 12.  It is also concurrent with State Road 68 for about a mile in Poseyville.  It then continues north before going east, ending at its parent route, State Road 65, at the  Owensville town square.

Like many State Highways in the area SR 165 often sees heavy coal truck traffic as it also provides a shortcut between the mines around Owensville and Princeton and the Port of Indiana in Mount Vernon.

Major intersections

References

External links

165